This is a list of public broadcasters by country.

Major broadcasters

Africa

Algeria
Établissement public de télévision — Algeria
 TV 1: Arabic Channel
 TV 2: French Channel 
 TV 3: News Channel 
 TV 4: Tamazigth Channel 
 TV 5: Quran Channel 
 TV 6: Youth Channel 
 TV 7: Distance Education Channel 
 TV 8: Algerian History Channel 
 TV 9: Algerian Parliament Channel

Radio Algeria

Angola
Televisão Pública de Angola
 TPA 1: General Channel
 TPA 2: Entertainment and Youth Channel
 TPA I: International Channel 
Rádio Nacional de Angola

Benin
Office de Radiodiffusion et Télévision du Bénin (ORTB)
 ORTB: General Channel.
 BB24: Economic Channel.
 ADO TV: Youth and Sports Channel.

Botswana
Botswana TV
 BTV 1
 BTV 2
 BTV 3
 BTV News
 Now Channel

Burkina Faso
Radio Télévision du Burkina
 RTB Télé: General Channel.
 RTB2 Hauts Bassins: Regional Channel Bobo Dioulasso Region.
 RTB2 Center: Regional Channel Ouagadougou Region.
 RTB2 East: Regional Channel East Region.
 RTB2 South West: Regional Channel Gaoua Region.
 RTB2 Sahel: Regional Channel Dori Region.
 RTB2 Center North: Regional Channel Kaya Region.
 RTB2 Center East: Regional Channel Tenkodogo Region.

Cameroon
Cameroon Radio Television
 CRTV General Channel
 CRTV News Channel
 CRTV Sports and Entertainment Channel

Cape Verde
RTC
TCV

Central African Republic
Radiodiffusion Television Centrafricaine

Chad
Radiodiffusion Nationale Tchadienne
Télé Tchad

Congo (Democratic Republic of)
Radio-Télévision nationale congolaise
RTNC1: general interest channel with national coverage
RTNC2 – Provincial public channel for entertainment and commercials in Kinshasa.

Congo (Republic of)
Radiodiffusion Télévision Congolaise
Télé Congo

Djibouti
Radio Television of Djibouti
RTD1
RTD2
RTD3
RTD4
RTD5
RTD6
RTD7

Egypt
ERTU
ERTU 1 (Al Oula) – General and informative programming. It began its transmissions in 1960.
ERTU 2 (Al Thanya): focused on fiction, entertainment and current affairs programming, launched in 1961.
 egyptian channel
Al Masriya - Channel aimed at the Egyptian diaspora, available since 1990.
Region Channel:

Cairo Channel - Broadcasts from Cairo and covers the Greater Cairo Governorates i.e. Cairo, Giza and Qalioubia.
Alexandria Channel - Broadcasts from Alexandria and covers Alexandria, Al Buhayrah and parts of Matrouh.
Channel Channel - Broadcasts from Ismailia and covers Suez Canal Governorates i.e. Ismailia, Suez and Port Said.
Delta Channel – Broadcasts from Tanta and covers Central Delta Governorates i.e. Al Gharbiyah, Al Minufiyah, Ad Daqahliyah, Kafr ash Shaykh and Dimyat.
Upper Channel – Broadcasts from Minya and covers the Northern Governorates of Upper Egypt, i.e. Minya, El-Fayoum, Beni Suef and Asyut.
Thebes Channel - Broadcasts from Aswan and covers the southern governorates of Upper Egypt, i.e. Suhag, Qena, Al Uqsur and Aswan.

Nile Television

Specialty channels include:

To the Nile
Nile Culture Channel
Nile Comedy Channel
Nile Drama Channel
Educational channels of the Nile, various channels for primary, high school, secondary, medical and language education.
Nile Family Channel
Nile Sports Channel
Nile Variety channel, specialized in various forms of entertainment, mainly concerts, music videos, contests and some talk shows.
Tanweer channel.

Equatorial Guinea
TVGE

Eritrea
Eri-TV

Eswatini
Eswatini Broadcasting and Information Service

Ethiopia
Ethiopian Broadcasting Corporation

Gabon
Radio Télévision Gabonaise

Gambia
Gambia Radio & Television Service

Ghana
Ghana Broadcasting Corporation (GBC)

Guinea-Bissau
Guinea-Bissau Television

Ivory Coast
Radiodiffusion Television Ivoirienne (RTI)
La Première : News and general programming
RTI 2 : Music and Entertainment
RTI Music TV : Popular music
RTI Sport TV : Sport

Kenya
Kenya Broadcasting Corporation

Liberia
LBS

Libya
LJBC (1977–2011)

Mali
Office de Radiodiffusion Television du Mali (ORTM)

Mauritania
TV de Mauritanie

Mauritius
Mauritius Broadcasting Corporation (MB)

Morocco
SNRT
Al Aoula
Arryadia
Athaqafia
Al Maghribia
Assadissa
Aflam TV
Tamazight TV
Laayoune TV

Mozambique
Televisão de Moçambique

Namibia
NBC

Niger
Office of Radio and Television of Niger

Nigeria
NTA 
FRCN

Rwanda
Radio Rwanda

São Tomé and Príncipe
TVS

Senegal
RTS

Sierra Leone
Sierra Leone Broadcasting Corporation (SLBC)

Somalia
Radio Mogadishu

South Africa
SABC–South Africa
Television
SABC 1
SABC 2
SABC 3
SABC News
SABC Sport
SABC Education
SABC Children
Radio (Each official language has a station)
SAfm (English)
5FM (English)
Metro FM (English)
Radio 2000 (English)
Good Hope FM (English and Afrikaans)
tru fm (English and Xhosa)
RSG (Afrikaans)
Ukhozi FM (Zulu)
Umhlobo Wenene FM (Xhosa)
Thobela FM (Northern Sotho)
Lesedi FM (Sotho)
Motsweding FM (Tswana)
Phalaphala FM (Venda)
Munghana Lonene FM (Tsonga)
Ligwalagwala FM (Swazi)
IKwekwezi FM (Ndebele)
X-K FM (!Xu and Khwe) — These are not official languages but significant communities exist in the Northern Cape Province
Lotus FM — (English and Hindi) — Targeted at the Indian community of South Africa
Channel Africa

South Sudan
South Sudan Broadcasting Corporation

Sudan
Sudan TV

Tanzania
TBC

Togo
Télévision Togolaise

Tunisia
Établissement de la Radio Tunisienne (مؤسسة الإذاعة التونسية)
Radio Tunis
Radio Tunis Chaîne Internationale (RTCI)
Radio Culture
Radio Jeunes
5 local stations, in El Kef, Gafsa, Monastir, Sfax, Tataouine and Grand Tunis
Établissement de la Télévision Tunisienne (مؤسسة التلفزة التونسية)
El Watania 1
El Watania 2

Uganda
Uganda Broadcasting Corporation (UBC)

Western Sahara
RASD TV
Radio National de LA R.A.S.D

Zambia
Zambia National Broadcasting Corporation

Zimbabwe
 Zimbabwe Broadcasting Corporation

Americas

Argentina
Radio y Televisión Argentina
Televisión Pública
Canal 7 Buenos Aires – Ciudad de Buenos Aires, Argentina 
Canal 10 – Tucumán — Tucumán, Argentina
Canal 10 – Rio Negro — Rio Negro, Argentina
Canal 10 – Córdoba — Córdoba, Argentina
Radio Nacional 870 AM
Radiodifusión Argentina al Exterior
Radio Nacional Rock
Radio Nacional Clásica 
Radio Nacional Folklórica

Bahamas
ZNS Broadcasting Corporation

Barbados
Caribbean Broadcasting Corporation

Bolivia
Bolivia TV

Brazil
Empresa Brasil de Comunicação
TV Brasil — Rio de Janeiro, Brasília, São Paulo and broadcast affiliates
TV Brasil Internacional — Available in Africa, Americas, Portugal and Japan by cable and satellite
TV Brasil Play
Rádio Nacional — Rio de Janeiro, Brasília (also available in Belo Horizonte, Recife and São Paulo), North Region and Tabatinga
Rádio MEC — Rio de Janeiro and Brasília
Fundação Padre Anchieta
TV Cultura — São Paulo and broadcast affiliates.
MultiCultura — São Paulo
Univesp TV — São Paulo
TV Rá-Tim-Bum – Children's channel, nationwide by cable and satellite.
Rádio Cultura FM — São Paulo
Rádio Cultura Brasil — São Paulo

Canada
Canadian Broadcasting Corporation — (National)
CBC Television
CBC News Network
CBC North
Documentary
Ici Radio-Canada Télé
Réseau de l'information
ARTV
Explora
CBC Radio One
CBC Music
CBC Radio 3 (no terrestrial broadcasting)
Ici Radio-Canada Première
Espace musique
Radio Canada International (no terrestrial broadcasting; international broadcasting only)
CBC Parliamentary Television Network (former)
Bande à part (former)
Newsworld International (former; international broadcasting only)
Trio (former; international broadcasting only)
CBC-2 (proposed)
Télé-2 (proposed)
Knowledge — British Columbia
TVOntario — Ontario
Télé-Québec — Quebec
TFO — Ontario
CFTU-TV — Montreal, Quebec (non-profit)
CKUA Radio Network — Alberta (non-profit)
CJRT-FM — Toronto, Ontario (non-profit)
Access — Alberta (former)
Saskatchewan Communications Network — Saskatchewan (former)

Chile
Televisión Nacional de Chile — Chile (National)
TV Chile
NTV
Canal 24 Horas

Colombia

National
Radio Televisión Nacional de Colombia
Señal Colombia
Señal Institucional

Regional
Canal 13
Teleantioquia
Telecafé
Teleislas
Televisión Regional del Oriente
Telecaribe
Telepacífico

Local
Canal Capital
Telemedellín

Costa Rica
Canal 13 (SINART) 
Canal 15 (Universidad de Costa Rica)

Cuba
Cuban Institute of Radio and Television
Cubavisión

Dominica
Dominica Broadcasting Corporation

Dominican Republic
Corporación Estatal de Radio y Televisión

Ecuador
Ecuador TV

El Salvador
 Canal 10 (Televisión de El Salvador) — El Salvador (National)

Guatemala
Guatevisión

Guyana
National Communications Network (NCN)

Haiti
Radio Télévision Nationale d'Haïti

Honduras
Comisión Nacional de Telecomunicaciones

Jamaica
Public Broadcasting Corporation of Jamaica

Mexico
Canal Once (TV; 1959)
Once Niños
Canal Catorce (TV; 2012)
Canal 22 (TV; 1982)

Nicaragua
Radio Nicaragua

Panama
Panama National Television

Paraguay
Paraguay TV
Canal 14 de Asunción, Paraguay 
PyTV News (cable television only) 
Canal 10 de San Pedro
Canal 12 de Pilar
Canal 19 de Río Paraguay 
Cadena de Radio Nacional del Paraguay 
Radio Nacional 920 AM
Eadio Nacional 95.1 FM
Radio Nacional San Pedro 
Radio Nacional Carlos Antonio López de Pilar

Perú
IRTP
TV Perú
Radio Nacional del Perú

Puerto Rico
Puerto Rico Public Broadcasting Corporation
WIPR (AM)
WIPR-FM
WIPR-TV

Trinidad and Tobago
Trinidad and Tobago Television

United States
Voice of America (1942)
Public Broadcasting Service (TV; 1970)
National Public Radio (1970)
MHz Networks (TV; 1972)
World (TV; 2005)
Create (TV; 2006)
PBS Kids 24/7 (TV; 2017)
American Public Media (2004)
Public Radio International (1983)
Public Radio Exchange (2003)
New York Public Radio (1924)
Chicago Public Radio (April 1943)
Pacifica Radio (1949)
Boston Public Radio (1951)
Minnesota Public Radio (1967)

Uruguay
Televisión Nacional Uruguay
UyTV News (cable television only) 
Canal 5 de Montevideo, Uruguay 
Canal 10 de Salto
Canal 12 de Rocha
Canal 21 de Río Uruguay 
Cadena de Radio Nacional del Uruguay
Radio Clasica
Radio Uruguay
Emisora del Sur
Babel FM

Venezuela
Radio Nacional de Venezuela
Venezolana de Televisión
ViVe (Visión Venezuela)

Transnational
teleSUR — Reaches the entire continent, Europe and Northern Africa. Owned by La Nueva Televisora del Sur, a public company sponsored by several American countries.
TV5Monde — France/Switzerland/Wallonia/Canada
TV5 Monde Style
TiVi5 Monde
TV5Monde Info
TV5 Québec Canada
Unis

Asia

Abkhazia
Abkhazian State Television and Radio Broadcasting Company

Afghanistan
Salam Watandar Radio Network
Radio Television Afghanistan

Bahrain
Bahrain Radio and Television Corporation

Bangladesh
Bangladesh Betar
Bangladesh Television
BTV Dhaka
BTV Chittagong
Sangsad Television

Bhutan
Bhutan Broadcasting Service

Brunei Darussalam
Radio Television Brunei (راديو التلفزيون بروناي|RTB)
Television:
RTB Perdana
RTB Aneka
RTB Sukmaindera
Radio:
Nasional FM
Pilihan FM
Pelangi FM
Harmoni FM
Nur Islam FM

Cambodia
National Television of Cambodia

China
 China Media Group (中央广播电视总台 "中国之声"|CMG) (sometimes categorized as "state broadcaster" rather than "public broadcaster")
 Television:
 National:
 China Central Television (中国中央电视台 "中央电视台/中央台/央视"|CCTV)
 National:
 CCTV-1 — General
 CCTV-2 — Finance
 CCTV-3 — Arts and Entertainment
 CCTV-5 — Sports
 CCTV-5+ — Sport Contests
 CCTV-6 — Movies (CPC owned channel)
 CCTV-7 — Military (PLA owned channel)
 CCTV-8 — Drama
 CCTV-9 — Documentaries
 CCTV-10 — Science and Education
 CCTV-11 — Chinese Opera
 CCTV-12 — Society and Law
 CCTV-13 — News
 CCTV-14 — Children
 CCTV-15 — Music
 CCTV-16 – Olympic (Olympic Channel China, IOC owned channel)
 CCTV-17 — Agriculture
 CCTV-4K — Ultra High Definition
 CCTV-8K — Ultra High Definition
 International:
 CCTV-1 Hong Kong and Macau — Broadcast in Hong Kong and Macau
 CCTV-4 — International (in Chinese)
 CCTV-4 Asia – Broadcast for Asia and Australia except Japan
 CCTV-4 Europe – Broadcast for Europe and Africa and broadcast HD in France
 CCTV-4 America – Broadcast for North America and South America
 CCTV-Daifu — In both Chinese and Japanese (broadcast Japan)
 CCTV Entertainment – Entertainment International (in Chinese)
 China Movies Channel – Movies (CPC owned channel)
 International:
 China Global Television Network (中国国际电视台 "中国环球电视网"|CGTN)
 CGTN — International news (in English)
 CGTN Documentary – International documentary (in English)
 CGTN French — International (in French)
 CGTN Spanish — International (in Spanish)
 CGTN Russian — International (in Russian)
 CGTN Arabic — International (in Arabic)
 Radio:
 National:
 China National Radio (中央人民广播电台 "中央台/央广"|CNR)
 National:
 CNR 1 The Voice of China (News radio)
 CNR 2 Business Radio
 CNR 3 MusicRadio
 State:
 CNR 4 Golden Radio
 CNR 5 Voice of the Chinese (News radio for Taiwan)
 CNR 6 Voice of the Divine Land (Entertainment radio for Taiwan)
 CNR 7 Radio The Greater Bay (Main broadcast based in Guangdong-Hong Kong-Macau Greater Bay Area)
 CNR 8 Ethnic Minority Radio
 CNR 9 Story Radio
 CNR 10 Senior Citizen Radio
 CNR 11 Tibetan Radio
 CNR 12 Happy Radio
 CNR 13 Uygur Radio
 CNR 14 / RTHK 6 Hong Kong Radio (Main broadcast based in Hong Kong)
 CNR 15 Highway Radio
 CNR 16 Countryside Radio
 CNR 17 Kazakh Radio
 International:
 China Radio International (中国国际广播电台 "国际台"|CRI)
 Easy FM
 Hit FM
 News Radio
 NEWS Plus
 Voice of the South China Sea
 CRI Global Services
 China Education Television (中国教育电视台|CETV)
 CETV-1 — Human resources
 CETV-2 — Distance education
 CETV-3 — Humanities
 CETV-4 — Classroom
 CETV-5 — Early Education

East Timor
Radio-Televisão Timor Leste

Hong Kong
Radio Television Hong Kong (香港電台|RTHK)
RTHK TV 31
RTHK TV 32
RTHK TV 33
RTHK TV 34
RTHK Radio 1
RTHK Radio 2
RTHK Radio 3
RTHK Radio 4
RTHK Radio 5
RTHK Radio 6
RTHK Mandarin Channel

India
Prasar Bharati 
All India Radio
AIR FM Gold (in Metro cities)
AIR FM Rainbow (in Metro cities)
AIR Live News 24x7 (in Metro cities)
AIR Urdu (in Metro cities)
Gyan Vani (in Metro cities)
Raagam (in Metro cities)
Vividh Bharati (in Metro cities)
Doordarshan
DD National
DD News
DD India
DD Sports
DD Bharati
DD Kisan
DD Urdu
DD Retro
Sansad TV

Indonesia
 Radio Republik Indonesia (RRI)
 National:
 RRI Pro 3
 Local:
 RRI Pro 1 – local stations
 RRI Pro 2 – local stations
 RRI Pro 4 – local stations
 International: Voice of Indonesia
 Televisi Republik Indonesia (TVRI)
 National:
 TVRI Nasional
 TVRI Sport
 Local: TVRI regional stations — 32 stations
 International: TVRI World
 Local public broadcasting institutions

Iran
IRIB

Iraq
Al Iraqiya
Alahad TV (funded by Quds Force)

Iraqi Kurdistan
Kurdistan 24

Israel
Israeli Public Broadcasting Corporation
 Kan 11
 Makan 33
 Kan Educational
 Kan Tarbut
 Kan Reshet Bet
 Kan Gimel
 Makan
 Kan 88
 Kan Kol HaMusica
 Kan Moreshet
 REKA

Japan
NHK (日本放送協会/Nippon Hōsō Kyōkai)
NHK General TV
NHK Educational TV
NHK BS-1
NHK BS Premium
NHK BS4K
NHK BS8K
NHK Radio 1
NHK Radio 2
NHK FM
NHK World-Japan
NHK World Premium

Jordan
Jordan Radio and Television Corporation (JRTV)

Kazakhstan
Qazaqstan

Kuwait
Kuwait Television 
KTV1
KTV2
KTV Sport
KTV Sport Plus
KTV Kids
Al Qurain channel
Al Araby Channel
Ethraa Channel 
Al Majles Channel

Kyrgyzstan
Public Broadcasting Corporation of the Kyrgyz Republic

Lebanon
Télé Liban
Radio Lebanon

Malaysia
Radio Televisyen Malaysia (RTM)
Television:
National:
TV1
TV2
TV6
TV Okey
Berita RTM
Sukan RTM
Radio:
National:
Ai FM (Chinese)
Nasional FM (Malay)
Radio Klasik (Malay)
TraXX FM (English)
Minnal FM (Tamil) (West Malaysia only)
Asyik FM (West Malaysia only)
State:
Johor FM
Kedah FM
Kelantan FM
KL FM
Malacca FM
Mutiara FM
Negeri FM
Pahang FM
Perak FM
Perlis FM
Red FM
Sabah FM
Sarawak FM
Selangor FM
Local:
Bintulu FM
Keningau FM
Labuan FM
Langkawi FM
Limbang FM
Miri FM
Sabah Vfm
Sandakan FM
Sibu FM
Sriaman FM
Tawau FM
Wai FM
Alhijrah Media Corporation
TV Alhijrah
Pertubuhan Berita Nasional Malaysia
Bernama TV
Sarawak Media Group
TVS

Macau
Teledifusão de Macau (澳門廣播電視股份有限公司 "澳廣視"|TDM)
Television:
Local:
TDM Ou Mun (澳視澳門) — Free-to-air in Cantonese
Canal Macau (澳視葡文) — Free-to-air in Portuguese and English
TDM Sport (澳視體育) — Sports programs
TDM Information (澳視資訊) — News and financial information programs
TDM Entertainment (澳視綜藝) — Variety and entertainment
TDM Macau World (澳視衛星頻道) — International channel
Mainland:
CCTV-1 (Hong Kong and Macau) (中國中央電視台綜合頻道港澳版) — Transmition of CCTV-1
CCTV-5 (中國中央電視台體育頻道) — Live broadcast of CCTV-5
CCTV-13 (中國中央電視台新聞頻道) — Live broadcast of CCTV-13
CGTN (中國環球電視網主頻道) — Live broadcast of CGTN
CGTN Documentary (中國環球電視網紀錄頻道) — Live broadcast of CGTN Documentary
Radio:
Rádio Macau in Cantonese (澳門電台中文頻道)
Rádio Macau in Portuguese (澳門電台葡文頻道)

Mongolia
Mongolian National Broadcaster

Nepal
Nepal Television (NTV) — Nepal
NTV PLUS 
NTV News
Radio Nepal

North Korea
Korean Central Broadcasting Committee (KCBC)
Korean Central Television (KCTV)
Korean Central Broadcasting Station (KCBS)
Voice of Korea (VOK)

Pakistan
Pakistan Television Corporation
PTV Home
PTV News
PTV Sports
PTV World
PTV National
AJK TV
PTV Bolan
PTV Global
PTV Parliament
PTV Teleschool
Radio Pakistan

Palestine
Palestinian Broadcasting Corporation
Voice for Palestine

Philippines
People's Television Network (PTV)
Philippine Broadcasting Service (PBS)
Radio Philippines Network (RPN)
Intercontinental Broadcasting Corporation (IBC)

Qatar
Qatar General Broadcasting and Television Corporation (QGBTC)
Qatar Radio
Qatar Television
Al Jazeera Media Network
Al Jazeera Arabic
Al Jazeera English
Al Jazeera Mubasher
Al Jazeera Balkans
Al Jazeera Documentary Channel

Saudi Arabia
Saudi Broadcasting Authority
Al Saudiya
Al Ekhbariya 
AlRiyadiya
Quran TV
Sunnah TV
Al Arabiya (based in Dubai)

Singapore
Mediacorp
Television:
Suria (Malay)
Channel 5 (English)
Channel U (Mandarin)
Channel 8 (Mandarin)
Vasantham (Tamil)
CNA (English)
Radio:
Ria 897 (89.7 FM) (Malay)
Gold 905 (90.5 FM) (English)
Symphony 924 (92.4 FM) (English)
YES 933 (93.3 FM) (Mandarin)
CNA938 (93.8 FM) (English)
Warna 942 (94.2 FM) (Malay)
Class 95 (95.0 FM) (English)
Capital 958 (95.8 FM) (Mandarin)
Oli 968 (96.8 FM) (Tamil)
Love 972 (97.2 FM) (Mandarin)
987 (98.7 FM) (English)

South Korea
Munhwa Broadcasting Corporation (MBC)
MBC TV
MBC Drama
MBC Sports+ 
MBC every1
MBC M 
MBC On
Channel M
MBC FM4U
MBC Standard FM 
MBC C&I
MBC Plus
MBC Voice Acting Division
Vlending (joint venture with SBS)
Korean Broadcasting System (KBS)
KBS1
KBS2
KBS UHD
KBS Life
KBS Drama
KBS N Sports
KBS Joy
KBS Kids
KBS Story
KBS News D
KBS World
KBS America
KBS World 24
KBS World Indonesia
KBS World Japan
KBS World Latino
KBS World TV
KBS Radio 1
KBS Radio 2 
KBS Radio 3 
KBS Classic FM
KBS Cool FM 
KBS Hanminjok Radio 
KBS World Radio 
Educational Broadcasting System (EBS)
EBS 1
EBS 2
EBS+1
EBS+2
EBS English
EBS Kids
EBS FM

Sri Lanka
Sri Lanka Rupavahini Corporation
Channel Eye
 Nethra TV
 Rupavahini
Sri Lanka Broadcasting Corporation
City FM
Kothmale FM / Kotmale Community Radio
Pirai FM (Muslim)
Vidula	
SLBC Commercial Service (Velanda Sevaya)		 
Thendral FM		 
Radio Sri Lanka		 
SLBC National Service (Swadeshiya Sevaya)	 
SLBC National Service	State Tamil 		 
SLBC Regional Service (Dabana)	
SLBC Regional Service (Jaffna)	
SLBC Regional Service (Kandurata Sevaya)		 
SLBC Regional Service (Rajarata Sevaya)	
SLBC Regional Service (Ruhunu Sevaya)	
SLBC Regional Service (Uva)	
SLBC Regional Service (Wayamba Handa)	
SLBC Sports Service
Independent Television Network
 ITN Channel 
 Vasanavantham TV 
 Prime TV
Vasantham FM
Prime Radio
ITN FM (formerly Lakhanda radio)

Syria
Syrian Television

Taiwan
Taiwan Broadcasting System (台灣公共廣播電視集團|TBS)
Public Television Service (公共電視 "公視"|PTS)
PTS Main Channel
PTS Taigi
PTS3
Hakka TV
Radio Taiwan International (中央廣播電台|RTI)
National Education Radio (國立教育廣播電臺|NER)
Police Radio Station (警察廣播電台|PRS)
Taipei Broadcasting Station (台北廣播電台|TBS)
Kaohsiung Broadcasting Station (高雄廣播電台|KBS)

Tajikistan
Televizioni Tojikiston

Thailand
Royal Thai Army Radio and Television (TV5 HD)
 TV 5 Radio (Bangkok Stations)
 FM 94.0 and 103.5 MHz 
 DAB+ Radio Test Project (VHF Channel 6 - 6C:185.360 MHz)
 National Broadcasting Services of Thailand (NBT)
 Radio Thailand
 Radio Thailand for Learning and Warning Network (Formerly Known as National Education Radio)
 Radio Thailand World Service
 NBT Digital 2 HD
 NBT Regional 11 (Separate broadcasting on 4 areas but HD only Central Area TV Program Chart)
Thai PBS (HD 3)
 ALTV (SD 4)
 Thai PBS Radio (Online)
 The National Assembly Radio and Television Broadcasting Station (TPChannel)
TP Radio (or Radio Parliament)
TPTV (10)

Turkmenistan
Coordinating Council for Television and Radio Broadcasting
Turkmenistan

United Arab Emirates
Abu Dhabi Media
 Abu Dhabi TV
 Al-Emarat TV
 Abu Dhabi Sports Channel
 Yas TV
 Quran Kareem
 Emarat FM
 Abu Dhabi FM
 Star FM
 Abu Dhabi Classic FM
 Kadak FM
 Radio 1 
 Radio 2
Dubai Media Incorporated
 Dubai TV (Arabic)
 Dubai One (English)
 Noor Dubai TV
 Sama Dubai
 Dubai Sports
 Dubai Racing
 Dubai Drama
 Dubai Radio
 Noor Dubai Radio
 Emirates 24/7

Uzbekistan
National Television and Radio Company of Uzbekistan

Vietnam
Vietnam Television (Đài Truyền hình Việt Nam|VTV) and Voice of Vietnam (Đài Tiếng nói Việt Nam|VOV)
VTV1
VTV2
VTV3
VTV4
VTV5
VTV6
VTV7
VTV8
VTV9
VTV Cần Thơ
Radio
VOV1
VOV2
VOV3
VOV4
VOV5  (also called VOV World)
VOV6
VOV Transportation 
VOV FM 89 MHz
VOV English 24/7
Television
Television channel VOV TV
The network VTC Digital Television
Other media platforms
Voice of Vietnam
VOV.VN
VOV Media
64 Local Broadcasters

Yemen
Yemen TV

Europe

Albania
RTSH

Andorra
Ràdio i Televisió d'Andorra

Armenia
Public Television Company of Armenia
Public Radio of Armenia

Austria
ORF
ORF 1
ORF 2
ORF III
ORF Sport +

Azerbaijan
İTV
İctimai Radio

Belarus
Belarus National State Broadcasting

Belgium
BRF — German-speaking Community of Belgium
RTBF — Wallonia
VRT — Flanders

Bosnia and Herzegovina
Radio and Television of Bosnia and Herzegovina (BHRT)
Radio-Television of the Federation of Bosnia and Herzegovina (RTVFBiH) (Federation of Bosnia and Herzegovina)
Radio Televizija Republike Srpske (RTRS) (Republika Srpska)

Bulgaria
BNT
BNR

Croatia
HRT
HRT 1
HRT 2
HRT 3
HRT 4
HR 1
HR 2
HR 3

Cyprus
CYBC

Czech Republic
Česká televize
ČT1
ČT1 JM - Southern Moravia
ČT1 SM - Northern Moravia
ČT1 JVC - Southeastern Bohemia
ČT1 SZC - Northwestern Bohemia
ČT2
ČT24
ČT sport
ČT :D
ČT art
Český rozhlas

Denmark
Danmarks Radio
DR1
DR2
DR Ramasjang
TV 2 Danmark
TV 2
TV 2 Zulu
TV 2 Charlie
TV 2 News
TV 2 Fri
TV 2 Sport
TV 2 Sport X

Estonia
Eesti Rahvusringhääling
ETV
ETV2
ETV+

Faroe Islands
Kringvarp Føroya
Sjónvarp Føroya
Útvarp Føroya

Finland
YLE
YLE TV1
YLE TV2
YLE Teema & Fem

France
Groupe de Radiodiffusion Française
France Télévisions
France 2
France 3
France 4
France 5
France Info
Radio France
France Inter
France Info
France Culture
France Musique
France Bleu
FIP
Le Mouv'
France Médias Monde
Radio France Internationale
France 24
Europe 1

Georgia
Georgian Public Broadcasting

Germany
ARD — working partnership of German public-service broadcasters
Westdeutscher Rundfunk — Cologne
Norddeutscher Rundfunk — Hamburg
Mitteldeutscher Rundfunk — Leipzig
Bayerischer Rundfunk — Munich
Südwestrundfunk — Stuttgart
Rundfunk Berlin-Brandenburg — Berlin
Hessischer Rundfunk — Frankfurt
Saarländischer Rundfunk — Saarbrücken
Radio Bremen — Bremen
German radio and TV from ARD: each broadcaster has several radio programs, like the biggest one (WDR) more than five "full" radio stations ("1 Live", WDR 2 (pop and info radio), WDR 3 (classical music) ... WDR 5) plus regional radio. WDR produces one TV-programme for its state and contributes to "Das Erste"–TV of ARD and to more TV-channels.
Deutsche Welle — World
DW-TV
DW (English)
DW (Arabia)
DW (Español)
DW (Deutsch+)
DW (Deutsch)
ZDF
Deutschlandradio

Gibraltar
GBC

Greece
EΔT (Greek Public Television) — Greece (formerly)
ERT — Greece (1938 – 11 June 2013; 11 June 2015–present)
NERIT — Greece (formerly; 4 May 2014 – 11 June 2015)

Greenland
KNR

Hungary
MTVA
Duna Médiaszolgáltató
Magyar Rádió
Magyar Televízió
Duna Televízió
Magyar Távirati Iroda

Iceland
RÚV

Ireland
RTÉ
RTÉ One (SD, HD & +1)
RTÉ2 (SD, HD & +1)
RTÉjr (SD)
RTÉ News (SD)
RTÉ Radio 1
RTÉ 2FM
RTÉ Radio 1 Extra
RTÉ 2XM
RTÉ Lyric FM
RTÉ Raidió na Gaeltachta
RTÉ Chill
RTÉ Gold
RTÉjr Radio
RTÉ Pulse
TG4

Isle of Man
Manx Radio
BBC Isle of Man

Italy
RAI
Rai 1
Rai 2
Rai 3
Rai 4
Rai 5
Rai Movie
Rai Premium
Rai Gulp
Rai Yoyo
Rai News 24
Rai Storia
Rai Sport
Rai Scuola
Rai 4K
Rai Italia
Rai World Premium
Rai Südtirol
Rai 3 BIS FJK
RAS

Kosovo
RTK

Latvia
LTV
LR

Liechtenstein 
 Liechtensteinischer Rundfunk

Lithuania
LRT
LRT televizija － General
LRT Plius － Culture, religion and sports
LRT Lituanica － Mix of LRT televizija and LRT Plius programmes
LRT Radijas (Radio station) － General, news
LRT Klasika (Radio station) － Culture, classical music
LRT Opus (Radio station) － Aimed for young people, modern music

Malta
PBS
TVM
TVM2

Moldova
Teleradio-Moldova

Monaco
Radio Monaco

Montenegro
RTCG

Netherlands
Nederlandse Publieke Omroep
AVROTROS
BNNVARA
EO
Human
KRO-NCRV
MAX
NOS
NTR
ON!
PowNed
VPRO
WNL
ZWART

North Macedonia
MRT

Norway
NRK
NRK1
NRK2
NRK3
NRK Super
TV2
TV 2 Zebra
TV 2 Livsstil
TV 2 Nyheter
TV 2 Sport

Poland
Polish Radio
TVP
 TVP1
 TVP2
 TVP3 (regional)
 TVP Info
 TVP Dokument
 TVP Kultura
 TVP Historia
 TVP Seriale
 TVP Sport
 TVP Rozrywka
 TVP Kobieta
 TVP ABC
 Alfa TVP
 TVP Nauka
 TVP HD
 TVP 4K
 TVP Polonia
 TVP World
 TVP Wilno
 Biełsat TV

Portugal
RTP
RTP1
RTP2
RTP3
RTP Memória
RTP África
RTP Internacional
RTP Açores
RTP Madeira
RDP Antena 1
RDP Antena 1 Açores
RDP Antena 1 Madeira
RDP Antena 2
RDP Antena 3
RDP Internacional
RDP África

Romania
Radio România
TVR
TVR1
TVR2
TVR3
TVR Info
TVR Cultural
TVR Moldova
TVR International

Russia
OTR (Obshchestvennoe Televidenie Rossii)
Channel One Russia
All-Russia State Television and Radio Broadcasting Company (VGTRK)
Russian Television and Radio Broadcasting Network
RT

San Marino
San Marino RTV

Serbia
RTS
RTV

Slovakia
Rozhlas a televízia Slovenska
:1 Jednotka
:2 Dvojka
:ŠPORT
:24

Slovenia
RTVSLO
TV SLO 1
TV SLO 2
TV SLO 3
Prvi program
Val 202
ARS

Spain
RTVE
La 1
La 2
Canal 24 Horas
Clan TVE
Teledeporte
TVE 4K
TVE Internacional
Star TVE HD
Castilla-La Mancha Media – Castilla–La Mancha
Corporació Catalana de Mitjans Audiovisuals – Catalonia
Corporación Aragonesa de Radio y Televisión – Aragon
Corporación Radio e Televisión de Galicia – Galicia
Corporació Valenciana de Mitjans de Comunicació – Valencia
EITB – Basque Country
Ens Públic de Radiotelevisió de les Illes Balears – Balearic Islands
Radio Televisión Canaria – Canary Islands
Radiotelevisión de la Región de Murcia – Murcia
Radiotelevisión del Principado de Asturias – Asturias
Radio Televisión Madrid – Madrid
Radio y Televisión de Andalucía – Andalusia

Sweden
SR – Sveriges Radio
SVT – Sveriges Television
SVT1
SVT2
SVT Barn
SVT24
Kunskapskanalen
UR – Sveriges Utbildningsradion

Switzerland
SRG SSR
SRF 1
SRF zwei
SRF info
RTS Un
RTS Deux
RSI La 1
RSI La 2
Televisiun Rumantscha

Turkey
Turkish Radio and Television Corporation (TRT)
TRT 1
TRT 2 
TRT 3 
TRT Haber 
TRT World
TRT Spor
TRT Spor 2
TRT Kurdî 
TRT Avaz 
TRT Çocuk 
TBMM TV 
TRT Türk 
TRT Müzik
TRT Belgesel 
TRT Arabi
TRT 4K 
Radyo 1 
TRT FM 
Radyo 3 
Radyo 4
Radyo 6
Voice of Turkey 
TRT Nağme 
TRT Avrupa FM
TRT Türkü

Ukraine
Suspilne Movlennia

United Kingdom
BBC
BBC One
BBC Two
BBC Three
BBC Four
BBC News
BBC Parliament
CBBC
CBeebies
BBC Scotland
BBC Alba
BBC Radio 1
BBC Radio 2
BBC Radio 3
BBC Radio 4
BBC Radio 5 Live
BBC Radio 1 Dance
BBC Radio 1 Relax
BBC Radio 1Xtra
BBC Radio 4 Extra
BBC Radio 5 Sports Extra
BBC Radio 6 Music
BBC Asian Network
BBC World Service
BBC Radio Scotland
BBC Radio nan Gàidheal
BBC Radio Shetland
BBC Radio Orkney
BBC Radio Wales
BBC Radio Cymru
BBC Radio Ulster
BBC Radio Foyle
BBC Local Radio — 40 stations
BBC Studios
BBC World News
BBC Kids
BBC Lifestyle
BBC HD
BBC Earth
BBC Brit
BBC First
BBC World Service
BBC Entertainment
BBC America
BBC UKTV
UKTV
Channel Four Television Corporation
Channel 4
Film4
E4
More4
4Music
4Seven
E4 Extra
The Box Plus Network
The Box
Kiss
Magic
Kerrang!
S4C — Wales
ITV
ITV1/UTV
ITV2
ITV3
ITV4
ITVBe
CITV
STV

Vatican City
Vatican Media
Vatican Radio

Transnational
3sat — Germany/Austria/Switzerland
Arte — France/Germany
BVN — Flanders and Netherlands television
TV5Monde — France/Switzerland/Wallonia/Canada
TV5 Monde Style
TiVi5 Monde
TV5Monde Info
TV5 Québec Canada
Unis

Oceania

Australia
Australian Broadcasting Corporation
ABC Television
ABC TV
ABC Canberra
ABD Darwin
ABN Sydney
ABQ Brisbane
ABS Adelaide
ABT Hobart
ABV Melbourne
ABW Perth
ABC TV Plus/ABC Kids
ABC Me
ABC News
ABC Local Radio
ABC Radio Sydney (2BL)
ABC Radio Melbourne (3LO)
ABC Radio Brisbane (4QR)
ABC Radio Adelaide (5AN)
ABC Radio Perth (6WF)
ABC Radio Hobart (7ZR)
ABC Radio Canberra (2CN)
ABC Radio Darwin (8DDD)
ABC Broken Hill (2NB)
ABC Central Coast (2BL/T)
ABC Central West (2CR)
ABC Coffs Coast (2MMR)
ABC Illawarra (2ILA)
ABC Mid North Coast (2KP)
ABC New England North West (2NU)
ABC Newcastle (2NC)
ABC North Coast (2NNR)
ABC Riverina (2RVR)
ABC South East NSW (2BA)
ABC Upper Hunter (2UH)
ABC Western Plains (2WPR)
ABC Ballarat (3CRR)
ABC Central Victoria (3ABCRR)
ABC Gippsland (3GLR)
ABC Goulburn Murray (3MRR)
ABC Mildura Swan Hill (3MIL)
ABC Shepparton (3GVR)
ABC South West Victoria (3WL)
ABC Wimmera (3WV)
ABC Northern Tasmania (7NT)
ABC Capricornia (4RK)
ABC Gold Coast (4ABCRR)
ABC Far North (4QCC)
ABC North Queensland (4QN)
ABC North West Queensland (4ISA)
ABC Southern Queensland (4QS)
ABC Sunshine Coast (4SCR)
ABC Tropical North (4QAA)
ABC Western Queensland (4QL)
ABC Wide Bay (4QB)
ABC North & West SA (5CK)
ABC Peninsula and West Coast (5LN)
ABC Riverland (5MV)
ABC South East SA (5MG)
ABC Goldfields-Esperance (6ED, 6GF)
ABC Great Southern (6WA)
ABC Kimberley (6BE)
ABC Midwest & Wheatbelt (6GN)
ABC Pilbara (6KP)
ABC South Coast (6AL)
ABC South West WA (6BS)
ABC Alice Springs (8AL)
ABC Katherine (8ABCRR)
ABC Classic
ABC NewsRadio
Radio National
Triple J
ABC Jazz
ABC Country
ABC Grandstand
ABC Extra
ABC KIDS Listen
Double J
Triple J Unearthed
ABC Classic 2
ABC Australia
ABC Radio Australia
ABC iview
ABC Listen
Special Broadcasting Service — Also available in New Zealand in selected regions
SBS
SBS Viceland — Branding licensed from Vice Media
SBS Food
SBS World Movies
NITV
SBS WorldWatch
SBS Radio 
SBS Radio 1
SBS Radio 2
SBS Radio 3
SBS Arabic24
SBS Chill
SBS PopAsia
SBS PopDesi
SBS PopAraby
SBS On Demand

Fiji
Fiji Broadcasting Corporation (FBC)

New Zealand
RNZ
RNZ National
RNZ Concert
RNZ Pacific
Māori Television
Whakaata Māori
Te Reo
TVNZ — six channels, commercial television and public television
TVNZ 1
TVNZ 2
TVNZ Duke
TVNZ 1+1
TVNZ 2+1
TVNZ Duke+1

Local networks
Channel North Television
CUETV
Face TV — Auckland Region broadcaster
TVHB

Samoa
Samoa Broadcasting Corporation (SBC)

Tonga
Tonga Broadcasting Commission (TBC)

Others

American Samoa
PBS American Samoa

References

Lists of broadcasters